LaC TV is an Italian regional television channel of Calabria based in the city of Vibo Valentia . It transmits a light entertainment program: movies, news and weather bulletins, film and sports on LCN 19.

The channel was founded in 1987 by Franco Iannuzzi in Vibo Valentia and its first name was Rete Kalabria, and in 1992 it is born the society retekalabria srl.

References

External links 
Official Site 

Television channels in Italy
Television channels and stations established in 2014
Free-to-air
Italian-language television networks